Datuk Seri Utama Raja Nong Chik bin Raja Zainal Abidin (born 14 February 1953) is a Malaysian politician, accountant and the former Minister of Federal Territories and Urban Wellbeing. He was a Senator in the Dewan Negara, the upper house of the Parliament of Malaysia from the United Malays National Organisation (UMNO), a component party of the Barisan Nasional (BN) coalition.

Background
Raja Nong Chik was born in the state of Perak in 1953 to a royal-linked family of civil servants. His grandfather, Mustafa Albakri was the first chairman of the Election Commission of Malaysia and also Keeper of the Rulers' Seal during the premiership of Tunku Abdul Rahman. His father, Raja Zainal Abidin Raja Tachik was secretary-general in the Ministry of Health under second prime minister Abdul Razak Hussein.

He attended Methodist Boys' School, Kuala Lumpur and later Victoria Institution before studying at the Royal Military College. He obtained his Bachelor of Economics from the University of Wales and is a certified accountant.

Raja Nong Chik began his career as an entrepreneur at the Federal Land Consolidation and Rehabilitation Authority (FELCRA) in 1978. He eventually rose to become executive director at a manufacturing company. As a prominent member in the Malaysian corporate scene, Raja Nong Chik became president of the Bumiputra Manufacturers' and Service Industry Association and also a member of the Malaysia Innovation Council.

He is currently the Patron of Kuala Lumpur FA.

Political career
Raja Nong Chik is a member of UMNO from the Lembah Pantai division. He became a Senator in the Dewan Negara in April 2008, and was appointed Federal Territories and Urban Well-being Minister by new prime minister Najib Tun Razak. He resigned from the Dewan Negara in April 2013 to contest in Lembah Pantai constituency in the 13th Malaysian general election, which he lost to incumbent MP Nurul Izzah Anwar, daughter of former deputy prime minister and opposition leader Anwar Ibrahim. In the 14th General Election, he contested the Lembah Pantai seat once again, but lost to Fahmi Fadzil, PKR communications director.

Election results

Honours
  :
  Member of the Order of the Defender of the Realm (AMN) (2000)
  :
  Grand Knight of the Order of the Territorial Crown (SUMW) - Datuk Seri Utama (2014)
  :
  Knight Commander of the Grand Order of Tuanku Jaafar (DPTJ) - Dato' (2002)

References

External links
Official website
Official Facebook Page

 

1953 births
Living people
People from Perak
Malaysian people of Malay descent
Malaysian Muslims
Government ministers of Malaysia
Members of the Dewan Negara
United Malays National Organisation politicians
Alumni of the University of Wales
Members of the Order of the Defender of the Realm
21st-century Malaysian politicians